The Sikka (also Sikkanese, Sika) people are an Indonesian ethnic group native to the region of east central Flores between the Bloh and Napung Rivers. In the city of Maumere, the center of the region, Sikka people occupy a separate block. The Sikka language, which is a member of the Timor-Ambon languages, is spoken by the Sikka people. The Sikka language has at least three recognized dialects, namely Sikka Natar dialect, Sara Krowe dialect and Ata Tana 'Ai or Sara Tana 'Ai dialect.

History

Timorese Sika
A group of mestizo from Sikka and Europeans settled in 1851 as a voluntary recruits from the UK according to Sikka Dili over in Portuguese Timor. In that year, the Portuguese government had José Joaquim Lopes de Lima to sign a treaty with the Netherlands concluded that the west of Timor, Flores island and other areas of the Lesser Sunda Islands are ceded to them. This agreement was later confirmed by the Treaty of Lisbon in 1859. The Sika people are formed in addition to the Bidau and Moradores as one of the three people groups that make up the Portuguese Armed Forces in the colony. All three ethnic groups lived in separate districts of the capital. As for language they still retained their original Malay language, but later switched to a Creole Portuguese. Today they have been absorbed into the same population and do not form their own distinct group anymore.

Religion
The primary religion practiced by the Sika people is Roman Catholicism. Sika people residing in the interior still retain their traditional ancestral worship and Agrarianism cult.

Culture
Sika people are part of the indigenous population of the Flores island. The material culture of the mountaineers retained more traditional elements than on the coast, especially in the western part, where the Catholic mission worked actively since the 17th century; where it is here that their culture acquired European features.

Traditional activities
Sika people engage in slash-and-burn agriculture with short forms of shifting cultivation. In the west of the coastal area, irrigation is used. Food crops farming include rice, corn, cassava and millet; and other commodities are such as peanuts and coconut palm. Sika people also raise horses, small cattle and poultry. Coastal fishing is also common. Weaving and braiding are well developed. Commodity-money relations are intertwined with numerous survivals of the traditional communal system, where it is manifested in the system of land ownership, regulation of marriages and in everyday life.

Lifestyle
Mountain villages are small and have a circular layout, are located on the steep slopes of the mountains; which served as protection against attacks. In the middle of the settlement there is an area with a temple and sacred megalithic shrines. Coastal settlements have a linear plan, located along a road or river. The dwelling frame and pillar structure, pile, in the mountains is designed for large families, while in the coastal areas, for a small family.

Clothing of the those living in the interior consists of a skirt or loincloth. In coastal villages, they carry kain (cloth) and a jacket or shirt.

The dietary of the Sika people are such as vegetable and mostly cereals from wheat and corn with spices, fruit and juice. Fish and meat are eaten on holidays.

References

Further reading
 
 

Ethnic groups in Indonesia